Hellinsia nigridactylus is a moth of the family Pterophoridae. It is known from Japan (Honshū, Kyushu), Korea, China and Russia.

The wingspan is 14–16 mm and the length of the forewings is 8–9 mm.

The larvae feed on Aster yomena. They usually fold three or four terminal leaves of the host plant and feed on the folded leaves from the inside, or fold a leaf and feed on patches of the under green tissue of the under surface, leaving the upper epidermis untouched. It may also refrain from folding a leaf, but feed directly on the under surface of a leaf, also leaving the upper epidermis untouched. Pupation usually takes place on the upper surface of the midrib of a leaf and directs to the base of a leaf.

References

External links 
 Taxonomic And Biological Studies Of Pterophoridae Of Japan (Lepidoptera)
 Japanese Moths

nigridactylus
Moths of Asia
Moths of Japan
Moths of Korea
Moths described in 1961